This is a list of the main roads in Switzerland. Together with the motorways, they are the main long distance roads. Unlike the motorways, they are usually not dual carriageways, and no toll vignette is required.

Drivers on main roads have the right of way. Drivers on all roads not listed below except motorways and expressways have to give the way.

Main roads signalized with "Main road number" 

The main roads 1 to 30 are signalized with the sign 4.57 "Main road number".

Main roads not signalized 
The main roads 100 and upwards are not signalized with the sign 4.57 "Main road number".

Common main roads

Restricted accessible main roads 

References 

Roads in Switzerland